Lowestoft Lifeboat Station is a Royal National Lifeboat Institution (RNLI) operated lifeboat station in the town of Lowestoft in the English county of Suffolk. The station is located at the mouth of Lowestoft's outer harbour on the South pier. It is one of the oldest lifeboat stations in the United Kingdom, having been established in 1801.

History
The station was established in 1801, when a lifeboat built by Henry Greathead began operating from the town. In 1807 the station became the first to operate a sailing lifeboat, the Frances Anne, which operated until 1850 and saved over 300 lives. The RNLI took control of the station in 1855. A second station operated in the town between 1870 and 1912, whilst the South Broads Lifeboat Station, an inshore station, operated at Oulton Broad between 2001 and 2011.

Crews from Lowestoft have received 45 awards for gallantry, including 39 medals. The RNLI Gold Medal has been awarded twice. The first award was to Lieutenant R B Matthews RN in October 1827. Coxswain John Swan was the second recipient, for his actions during the rescue of the crew of the merchant ship , wrecked on North Scroby Sands in October 1922. The lifeboat Michael Stephens took part in the Dunkirk evacuation in 1940.

Fleet

References

Lowestoft
Lifeboat stations in Suffolk